Serendah is a town and mukim in Hulu Selangor District, Selangor, Malaysia. The town is now growing at a steady phase and is among the largest suburb outside the skirt of Kuala Lumpur ontop of being the most populated mukim (township) in Hulu Selangor District.

History
The area was developed due to tin mining activities during the British administration. 

One of the popular tourist spot in Serendah, Perigi Tujuh Serendah, was built to resist floods hence the name Serendah that reflects this area being located at a low level in comparison to its surroundings.

Geography

Encompassing from Sungai Choh in the south, town of Bukit Beruntung in the west, and Antara Gapi in the north, the mukim of Serendah has a total area of -sq mi, -sq mi of which is land and -sq mi, or -% is water.

Demographics

Religion
There are a number of Chinese temples, one Mosque and a number of surau, one Sikh temple and other religious structure of other regions.
 Hock Leng Keng Temple (双文丹福灵宫), founded in 1869
 Goddess Mazu Temple (妈祖庙)
 Sze Yeah Kong Temple (仙四師爺宮), founded in 1898
 Jing Loong Shan Wan Fo Shih (金龙山万佛寺)
 Liang Liang Temple (娘娘庙)
 Mosque Serendah at Jalan Besar KL-Ipoh 
 Sikh Temple - Gurdwara Sahib Serendah
 Vinayagar Temple

Education
There is one secondary school and three primary schools:
 Sekolah Menengah Kebangsaan Serendah 
 Sekolah Jenis Kebangsaan (Cina) Serendah 
 Sekolah Rendah Kebangsaan Serendah

Development

A new Komuter station, The Serendah Komuter station which is stationed roughly two kilometres northwest from and named after Serendah, is opened on April 21, 2007 alongside the Rasa and Batang Kali stations.

Perodua, one of the national car maker is headquartered in Serendah.

See also
 Serendah Komuter station

References

Hulu Selangor District
Mukims of Selangor